Money Heist is a Spanish heist crime drama media franchise created by Álex Pina. It is centered around a television series which followed two long-prepared heists led by the Professor. The narrative of the series is told in a real-time-like fashion, relying on flashbacks, time-jumps, hidden character motivations, and an unreliable narrator (Tokyo) for complexity.

The franchise was launched with the two-part, 15-episode limited television series Money Heist, which premiered on Spanish network Antena 3 on May 2, 2017. Despite little ratings success during its initial run (in spite of its positive reviews), the series went on to become an international hit when the first part was released outside Spain on Netflix in late 2017. As a result of the series' success, Netflix bought the rights from Antena 3's parent company, Atresmedia Televisión, and ordered 26 additional episodes that were released across three parts. The fifth and final part was released across two volumes on September 3 and December 3, 2021, respectively. Following the original series' conclusion, a South Korean remake, Money Heist: Korea – Joint Economic Area, was released across two parts on June 24 and December 9, 2022, respectively; and a spin-off series, Berlin, is in development and slated for a 2023 release. Both the original series and its South Korean remake enjoyed consistently positive reviews over the years.

In addition to the television and streaming series, two making-of documentary films, Money Heist: The Phenomenon and Money Heist: From Tokyo to Berlin, were released between 2020 and 2021. A video game was also announced to be in development.

Background 
The initial idea for Money Heist dates back to sometime during creator and head writer Álex Pina and director Jesús Colmenar's years of collaboration at Globomedia, where they first coincided in 2008. In spring 2016, after production of the second season of Locked Up ended, the two left Globomedia to start their own production company, Vancouver Media, and their two options for the company's debut project were a comedy project and a heist story for television, before ultimately settling for the latter. Pina and Colmenar started developing the series, then titled Los desahuciados, alongside former Globomedia and Locked Up colleagues, as a passion project to try new things without outside interference. Pina eventually pitched the series to Atresmedia's then-Head of Fiction, Sonia Martínez, who told him to "do it".

The series was first announced in November 2016 as a limited television series, something that Pina was firm about as he felt that dilution had become a problem for his previous productions. The limited series was then split into two parts, shot back-to-back due to financial necessity. Casting took place in late 2016 and filming began in late January 2017. The series premiered on Atresmedia's main television network Antena 3 on May 2, 2017, and while its first episode ended up being the most-viewed premiere for a Spanish series since Down Below in April 2015, ratings quickly declined during the show's first part, despite positive reviews, and fell even further during the second part, before ending on November 23, 2017. After the first part finished, Netflix included it in its catalogue in Spain after acquiring the series in July 2017, with plans for an international release in Autumn of that year.

On December 20, 2017, one month after Money Heist ended on Antena 3, Netflix released the first part outside Spain without any promotion, re-cutting its nine 70-minute episodes into 13 50-minute episodes. A similar recut was done to the second part of the series, with its six episodes being turned into nine, which was released outside Spain on April 6, 2018. Despite giving it no promotion, the series became an unexpected international hit on Netflix and went on to become the most-watched foreign-language series in the service's history at the time. As a result of this success, in April 2018, after the release of the second part on the service, Netflix bought the rights to Money Heist from Atresmedia and announced that it would produce a third part, which was shot back-to-back with an additional fourth part, much like the first two parts. The third and fourth parts were released on July 19, 2019 and April 3, 2020, respectively. In July 2020, Netflix renewed the series for a fifth and final part, which was itself separated in two volumes that were released on September 3 and December 3, 2021, respectively. In November 2021, shortly before the release of Money Heist'''s final episodes, Netflix announced that it had commissioned a spin-off series titled Berlin, starring Pedro Alonso's character from the original series, with a 2023 release date.

In June 2020, BH Entertainment and Zium Content entered negotiations with Netflix for a potential South Korean remake of Money Heist. In December 2020, the remake was officially announced and greenlit with a total of 12 episodes. Much like the original series, it was split into two parts, with the first part being released on June 24, 2022 on Netflix, and the second part being released on December 9, 2022.

Television series

 Money Heist (2017–2021) 

The first two parts of Money Heist follow a mysterious man in Madrid, Sergio Marquina (Álvaro Morte), better known as "the Professor", who recruits a group of eight people, who choose city names as their aliases – Silene Oliveira "Tokyo" (Úrsula Corberó), Andrés de Fonollosa "Berlin" (Pedro Alonso), Agustín Ramos "Moscow" (Paco Tous), Ágata Jiménez "Nairobi" (Alba Flores), Aníbal Cortés "Rio" (Miguel Herrán), Daniel Ramos "Denver" (Jaime Lorente), Mirko Dragić "Helsinki" (Darko Perić) and Radko Dragić "Oslo" (Roberto García Ruiz) –, to carry out an ambitious plan that involves entering the Royal Mint of Spain, and escaping with €2.4 billion. After taking 67 people hostage inside the Mint, the team plans to remain inside for 11 days to print the money as they deal with elite police forces.

In parts three to five, after the events of the heist on the Mint, the group's members are forced out of hiding after Río is caught thanks to an intercepted phone, and prepare for a second heist, this time on the Bank of Spain, with some additional members – Martín Berrote "Palermo" (Rodrigo de la Serna), Santiago Lopez "Bogotá" (Hovik Keuchkerian) and Jakov "Marseille" (Luka Peroš)–, to force Europol to hand over Rio and prevent his torture. After entering the Bank, they aim to escape with gold, as they deal once again with hostages and police forces.

 Money Heist: Korea – Joint Economic Area 

As a remake of Money Heist, Money Heist: Korea – Joint Economic Area follows a similar story to that of the original series. Set in a reunified Korea that came to be due to a Joint Economic Area built at the expense of the lower classes, strategist criminal mastermind Park Sun-ho (Yoo Ji-tae), nicknamed "the Professor", enlists a group of people, who choose city names as their aliases – Lee Hong-dan "Tokyo" (Jeon Jong-seo), Song Jung-ho "Berlin" (Park Hae-soo), Oh Man-sik "Moscow" (Lee Won-jong), Sim Young-mun "Nairobi" (Jang Yoon-ju), Han Joseph "Rio" (Lee Hyun-woo), Oh Taek-su "Denver" (Kim Ji-hoon), Ko Myung-tae "Helsinki" (Kim Ji-hun) and Lee Sang-yeon "Oslo" (Lee Kyu-ho) – to pull a ₩4 trillion heist on the Mint based in the Joint Economic Area. After successfully entering the Mint and taking the hostages inside, the team attempts to remain inside for enough days to print the money while the police tries to stop them.

 Berlin (2023) 
In November 2021, Netflix announced that it will create a direct spin-off series of Money Heist titled , starring Pedro Alonso, which is set to be released in 2023.

Documentaries

Money Heist: The Phenomenon (2020)

A documentary involving the producers and the cast of Money Heist, titled Money Heist: The Phenomenon, was released to Netflix on April 3 2020. Looking at "how Money Heist became a global phenomenon", the series focuses on the series' "unexpected rise in popularity", its acquisition by Netflix, and its impact on culture across the world. It breaks down the production of the series, and includes interviews with the creators, cast and crew of the show.

Money Heist: From Tokyo to Berlin (2021)
A two-part sequel documentary, titled  and focusing on the production of the 26 additional episodes and overall creation of the franchise of a whole, was released on 3 September and 3 December 2021, respectively, simultaneously with the final season of Money Heist.

Recurring cast and characters

Reception
Critical reception
The first two parts of Money Heist received positive reviews from Spanish television critics. Nayín Costas of El Confidencial named the premiere a promising start that captivated viewers with "adrenaline, well-dosed touches of humor and a lot of tension," but considered it a challenge to maintain the dramatic tension for the remainder of the series. While considering the pilot's voice-over narration unnecessary and the sound editing and dialogs lacking, Natalia Marcos of El País enjoyed the show's ensemble cast and the ambition, saying "It is daring, brazen and entertaining, at least when it starts. Now we want more, which is not little." Reviewing the full first part, Marcos lauded the series for its outstanding direction, the musical selection and for trying to innovate Spanish television, but criticized the length and ebbing tension. At the end of the series' original run, Nayín Costas of El Confidencial commended the series for its "high quality closure" that may make the finale "one of the best episodes of the Spanish season", but regretted that it aimed to satisfy viewers with a predictable happy ending rather than risk to "do something different, original, ambitious", and that the show was unable to follow in the footsteps of Pina's Locked Up.

After the series' move to Netflix for its international release, foreign critics also praised the series. Adrian Hennigan of the Israeli Haaretz said the series was "more of a twisty thriller than soapy telenovela, driven by its ingenious plot, engaging characters, tense flash points, pulsating score and occasional moments of humor", but taunted the English title "Money Heist" as bland. In a scathing review, Pauline Bock of the British magazine New Statesman questioned the global hype of the series, saying that it was "full of plot holes, clichéd slow-motions, corny love stories and gratuitous sex scenes", before continuing to add that "the music is pompous, the voice-over irritating, and it's terribly edited". John Doyle of The Globe and Mail praised parts 1 and 2 for the heist genre subversions; he also said that the series could be "deliciously melodramatic at times" with "outrageous twists and much passion" like a telenovela. Jennifer Keishin Armstrong of the BBC saw the series' true appeal in the interpersonal dramas emerging through the heist between "the beautiful robbers, their beautiful hostages, and the beautiful authorities trying to negotiate with them." David Hugendick of Die Zeit found the series "sometimes a bit sentimental, a little cartoonesque," and the drama sometimes too telenovela-like, but "all with a good sense for timing and spectacle."

The third part also received positive reviews, although they were slightly less so than those of its predecessors. On review aggregator website Rotten Tomatoes, it received an approval rating of 100% based on 12 reviews, with an average rating of 7/10. The site's critical consensus reads, "An audacious plan told in a non-linear fashion keeps the third installment moving as Money Heist refocuses on the relations between its beloved characters." While lauding the technical achievements, Javier Zurro of El Español described the third part as "first-class entertainment" that was unable to transcend its roots and lacked novelty. He felt unaffected by the internal drama between the characters and specifically, disliked Tokyo's narration for its hollowness. Alex Jiménez of Spanish newspaper ABC found part 3 mostly succeeding in its attempts to reinvent the show and stay fresh. Euan Ferguson of The Guardian recommended watching part 3, as "it's still a glorious Peaky Blinders, just with tapas and subtitles," while Pere Solà Gimferrer of La Vanguardia found that the number of plot holes in part 3 could only be endured with constant suspension of disbelief. Though entertained, Alfonso Rivadeneyra García of Peruvian newspaper El Comercio said the show does "what it does best: pretend to be the most intelligent boy in class when, in fact, it is only the cleverest."

The South Korean remake, Money Heist: Korea – Joint Economic Area, also enjoyed mixed-to-positive reviews from professional critics. On Rotten Tomatoes, it had an approval rating of 83% based on 12 reviews, with an average rating of 6.40/10. On Metacritic, the series has a weighted average score of 55 out of 100 based on 5 critics, indicating "mixed or average reviews". Joel Keller of Decider appreciated the performances of Yoo Ji-tae as the Professor, Jeon Jong-seo as Tokyo and Kim Yun-jin as Seon Woo-jin, writing, "each providing just the right tone to make the show less an over-the-top heist series and more of a layered treatise on the economic gap that everyone is suffering through at this stage in world history." Keller concluded, "If you're a fan of Money Heist, you'll like Money Heist: Korea – Joint Economic Area." Pierce Conran of the South China Morning Post rated the series with 3.5 out of 5 stars and wrote, "the purpose of Money Heist is to entertain rather than educate, and entertain it does with a story that hums along with all the thrills and twists required of a well-planned and inventively thwarted heist narrative." Daniel Hart of Ready Steady Cut graded the part 1 of season 1 with 3.5 stars out of 5 and wrote, "The production is impressive, the script is punchy, and the characters do well to represent their original counterparts." In conclusion Wilson wrote, "this remake is worth the time and investment, at least for the purely invested performances and production. Money Heist is back, so we shouldn't grumble." Kate Sánchez writing in Butwhythopodcast rated the part 1 8.5/10 and praised the cast writing, "Money Heist Korea is a phenomenal series because of its cast," Sánchez liked the chemistry between cast, writing, "chemistry that crackles between each and every cast member that pushes Money Heist Korea to be a dynamic show with uncertainty running through every scene." Concluding her review Sánchez wrote, "Ultimately Money Heist is expertly crafted to push tension and showcase action while also managing to investigate the way people interact with each other." S. Poorvaja of The Hindu wrote, "The first season of Money Heist: Korea - Joint Economic Area gets right in terms of its setting and characters, but here's hoping the makers push the envelope and take some risks in the second season."

Public response

After the move to Netflix, the series remained the most-followed series on Netflix for six consecutive weeks and became one of the most popular series on IMDb. It regularly trended on Twitter world-wide, largely because celebrities commented on it, such as football players Neymar and Marc Bartra, American singer Romeo Santos, and author Stephen King. While users flooded social networks with media of themselves wearing the robbers' outfit, the robbers' costumes were worn at the Rio Carnival, and Dalí icons were shown on huge banners in Saudi Arabia football stadiums. Real footage of these events would later be shown in part 3 as a tribute to the show's international success. The Musée Grévin in Paris added statues of the robbers to its wax museum in summer 2018. The show's iconography was used prominently by third parties for advertising, sports presentations, and in porn.

There have also been negative responses to the influence of the show. In numerous incidents, real heist men wore the show's red costumes and Dalì masks in their attacks or copied the fictional robbers' infiltration plans. The robbers' costumes were banned at the 2019 Limassol Carnival Festival as a security measure as a result. The series was used in an attack on YouTube, when hackers removed the most-played song in the platform's history, "Despacito", and left an image of the show instead. In unrelated reports, a journalist from Turkish TV channel AkitTV and an Ankaran politician have both warned against the show for supposedly encouraging terrorism and being "a dangerous symbol of rebellion".

Spanish newspaper El Mundo saw the public response as a reflection of the "climate of global disenchantment" where the robbers represent the "perfect antiheroes", and the New Statesman explained the show's resonance with international audiences as coming from the "social and economic tensions it depicts, and because of the utopian escape it offers." Viewer response was especially high in Mediterranean Europe and the Latin world, in particular Spain, Italy, France, Portugal, Brazil, Chile and Argentina, so Spanish as a common language did not appear to be a unifying reason for the show's success. Writer Javier Gómez Santander and actor Pedro Alonso (Berlin) rather argued that the Latin world used to feel at the periphery of global importance, but a new sentiment was coming that Spain could compete with the global players in terms of media production levels and give the rest of the world a voice. The series was one of two Spanish language TV series to be featured in TV Time's top 50 most followed TV shows ever, currently being the fifth most followed series on the platform.

Accolades

Music

The theme song of Money Heist, "My Life Is Going On," was composed by Manel Santisteban, who also served as composer on Locked Up. Santisteban approached Spanish singer, Cecilia Krull, to write and perform the lyrics, which are about having confidence in one's abilities and the future. The theme song is played behind a title sequence featuring paper models of major settings from the series. Krull's main source of inspiration was the character Tokyo in the first episode of the series, when the Professor offers her a way out of a desperate moment. The lyrics are in English as the language that came naturally to Krull at the time of writing.

The Italian anti-fascist song "Bella ciao" plays multiple times throughout the series and accompanies two emblematic key scenes: at the end of the first part the Professor and Berlin sing it in preparation for the heist, embracing themselves as resistance against the establishment, and in the second part it plays during the thieves' escape from the Mint, as a metaphor for freedom. Regarding the use of the song, Tokyo recounts in one of her narrations, "The life of the Professor revolved around a single idea: Resistance. His grandfather, who had fought against the fascists in Italy, taught him the song, and he taught us." The song was brought to the show by writer Javier Gómez Santander. He had listened to "Bella ciao" at home to cheer him up, as he had grown frustrated for not finding a suitable song for the middle of part 1. He was aware of the song's meaning and history and felt it represented positive values. "Bella ciao" became a summer hit in Europe in 2018, mostly due to the popularity of the series and not the song's grave themes.

 Video games 
In November 2020, Netflix partnered with Tom Clancy's Rainbow Six Siege for an in-game Money Heist-themed event, where hostages on the Bank map, wore Money Heist outfits. Outfits for 2 in-game characters were purchasable and the music in the background during the heist, was Bella Ciao.

In June 2022, Netflix announced that a video game based on Money Heist'' was in development, centered around a new heist by the Professor and his team to a casino in Monaco, as part of a favor to an old friend of the Professor's. The game is being developed by Colombian studio Killasoft and is expected to be published by Netflix for mobile phones as part of the company's mobile gaming service.

References

External links

  
 Money Heist on Rotten Tomatoes
 
 Money Heist: Korea – Joint Economic Area at Daum 

 
Mass media franchises introduced in 2017
Television franchises